James Gale may refer to:

 James Gale, founder of Gale & Polden, a British printer and publisher
 James Gale (cricketer) (born 1986), cricketer for Guernsey
 James Scarth Gale (1863–1937), Canadian Presbyterian missionary, educator and Bible translator in Korea
 James Gale (1956–2011), actor and director in American and British theatre, member of Royal Shakespeare Company